The Honda Phantom TA200 is a single cylinder Thai-made "retro cruiser" motorcycle.  It was known in Australia as the TA Shadow. Production of the TA200 was stopped in Thailand on 3 March 2010.

Overall design was very similar to the Honda TA150. The major differences was that the TA200 contains a four-stroke engine and higher 197 cc displacement.

This motorcycle was very popular in Singapore due to it being one of the few cruisers available for a class 2B license (the most basic motorcycle license in Singapore). Class 2B license holders are only allowed to ride motorcycles with displacement below 200 cc.

Specifications 

Engine Type: 4-stroke Single-cylinder, air-cooled, 2-valve SOHC
Displacement: 196.9 cc
Bore x Stroke 63.5 mm x 62.2 mm
Compression Ratio: 9.0:1
Ignition System: CDI
Redline: Unknown - early TA200s (Custom 3? Short handlebar version) up to 2004 have NO rev limiter
6-speed gearbox (Conventional motorcycle 1N23456)
Clutch System: Wet Multiplate Clutch
Drivetrain: Chain (520)
Sprockets (Front / Rear tooth count): 13 / 39 or 41 (standard)
Dimensions (WxLxH): 775 x 2256 x 1085 mm
Seat Height: 699 mm
Wheelbase: 1505 mm
Front Tire: 90/90R17 / 49P. 
Rear Tire: 130/90R15 / 66P.
Dry Weight: 140 kg
Fuel Tank Capacity (Total / Reserve): 9.68 litres / 2 litres
MPG: City riding (2 pax), 48 mpg, 17 km per L, Highway riding 75 mpg, 26 km per L
Suspension System: Front - Telescopic, Rear, Double Shock
Brake System: Front / Rear Disc Brakes (Dual Piston Calipers)
Tyre Size: Front - 90/90 - 17M / C49P (Tubeless) ; Rear - 130/90 15M / C66P (Tubeless), available from Metzeler (Lasertec), Pirelli (City Demon), Bridgestone (Exedra), IRC (from Thailand) and Shinko (with white-walled option)
Battery: Maintenance-Free 12V - 3.5Ah
Max. Power Output: 12.3 kW / 16.48 hp @ 8000 rpm
Max. Torque: 16.2 nm / 11.95 lb-ft @6500 rpm

References 

Honda motorcycles
Cruiser motorcycles
Motorcycles introduced in 2001